Opara may refer to:

 Andro Krstulović Opara (born 1967), Croatian politician
 Austin Opara (born 1963), Nigerian politician
 Charity Opara (born 1972), Nigerian sprinter
 Christy Opara-Thompson (born 1971), Nigerian sprinter
 David Opara (born 1985), Nigerian footballer
 Emeka Opara (born 1985), Nigerian footballer
 Ike Opara (born 1989), American soccer player
 Jerzy Opara (born 1948), Polish sprint canoer
 Lloyd Opara (born 1984), British footballer

Other uses
 Oparo, an alternate name for Rapa Iti, one of the Bass Islands in French Polynesia
 Opara, Novi Travnik, a village in Bosnia and Herzegovina

See also
 
 Opera (disambiguation)